Acalolepta noctis is a species of beetle in the family Cerambycidae. It was described by Frederik Goussey in 2007. It is known from the Solomon Islands.

References

Acalolepta
Beetles described in 2007